Henry Robinson Locke (1856 - 1927)
was an American photographer in the 19th and 20th century who photographed the Wild West. He ran a studio in Deadwood, South Dakota. He photographed the Black Hills area, Deadwood, Crow Indians, farmers, miners, railroads, but also Calamity Jane (1885) and the Little Big Horn battlefield (1894).

American photographers
19th-century American people
1856 births
1927 deaths